Many games contain time travel elements. This list includes video games, board games, pen and paper role-playing games and play by mail games which strongly feature time travel.

Video games
Time travel has been used and explored by both film, literature, and video games. Unlike films and literature, video games allow the player to interact directly, opening up different forms of gameplay. Time travel as a plot device has been employed in video games since early arcade games. The manipulation of time as an aspect of gameplay entered the mainstream following the release of Prince of Persia: The Sands of Time in 2003, though earlier titles such as 2000's The Legend of Zelda: Majora's Mask have employed it.

Board games
Various kinds of family and simulation games exist, where people play face-to-face or around a table, or within earshot of each other, or passing written notes around, where the topic or mechanics of the game include time travel.
 Khronos
 U.S. Patent No. 1, designed by James Ernest and Falko Goettsch
 Time Tunnels, designed by Robert Von Gruenigen in 1988 for Uncontrollable Dungeon Master; hex and counter hidden movement war game
 Timelag, designed by Mike Vitale in 1980 for Gameshop/Nova Game Designs; wargame, with a relativity mechanic
 Doctor Who: The Game of Time & Space, designed by Derek Carver in 1980 for Games Workshop Ltd.; players collect artifacts

Card games
 Chrononauts
 Dino Hunt by Steve Jackson Games
 Doctor Who: Battles in Time, designer uncredited in 2006 for G E Fabbri; collectible card game and magazine
 The Doctor Who Collectible Card Game, designed by Eamon Bloomfield and Paul Viall in 1996 for MMG Ltd.; players "overwhelm" their opponent
 Towers in Time, designed by Mike Sager in 1994 for Thunder Castle Games; collectible card game

Tabletop Role-playing games
 C°ntinuum
 The Doctor Who Role Playing Game
 Dungeons and Dragons
 GURPS Time Travel
 LegendMUD - the multi-user dungeon creation of gaming guru Raph Koster
 Time Lord
 Timelords
 Timemaster
 Timeship (1983)
 Transdimensional Teenage Mutant Ninja Turtles (1989)

Game expansions
The Sims 3: Into the Future, by EA Maxis, the eleventh and final expansion for The Sims 3 series before releasing The Sims 4 in Autumn of 2014

References

External links
 Time travel in videogames
 Replica
 Replicat

 
 
Time travel